Richard Fredericks may refer to:

 Richard Fredricks (born 1933), American opera singer
 J. Richard Fredericks, United States ambassador